WEBC (560 kHz) is an AM radio station located in Duluth, Minnesota, owned by Townsquare Media. It airs a sports format branded as "Northland Fan".

The AM station feeds an FM translator W293CT at 106.5 MHz.  While the FM station is limited in its coverage area, the AM station can be heard through much of Northeastern Minnesota and Northwestern Wisconsin.  It transmits with 5,000 watts around the clock.  The studios and offices are shared with its three other sister stations at 14 East Central Entrance in the Duluth Heights area of Duluth.

History
WEBC is the oldest radio station in the Duluth-Superior market and was founded by Leslie Ross, who owned Ross Electric Shop in Superior, Wisconsin. Ross ran WEBC as a hobby; it was funded on a "shoe-string budget" by proceeds from Ross Electric Shop. WEBC was broadcast from a small top-floor room of the three-story Superior Evening Telegram newspaper building. Atop the building were two towers, one on each end of the building, with the transmitting antenna hung between them, as was the manner of broadcast stations of the day.

Ross's tower engineer was Walter C. Bridges, who on June 1, 1924, helped WEBC sign on using 50 watts of power on AM 1240. For its first year, WEBC was operated out of Bridges's home in the upstairs of the Evening Telegraph building.  Duluth studios were established in 1926 on the second floor of the Spalding Hotel. The community of license was later changed to Duluth, though WEBC's transmitter has always remained on the Wisconsin side of the bridge.

The station was temporarily raised to 500 watts in 1928 in order to provide radio service to President Calvin Coolidge, who was vacationing nearby. Charles B. Persons, who Ross hired at the age of 17 in 1926, produced and broadcast content that included details of Coolidge's activities, such as fishing on the Brule River in Wisconsin during his three-month vacation, as well as Mr. & Mrs. Coolidge touring the streets of Duluth by chauffeured motorcar to greet devoted supporters. The New York Times nicknamed WEBC "The President's Station." WEBC joined NBC at this time in order to provide the vacationing president with coverage of the national political conventions. Persons continued to work for WEBC for 28 years, covering local and national news, sports, presidential administrations and wars.

WEBC's owners founded WMFG in Hibbing, Minnesota, in 1935; and WHLB in Virginia, Minnesota, in 1936.  The three stations were linked for local programming as part of the Arrowhead Radio Network.  WEBC's influence in regional programming was strengthened in 1942 when WMFG and WHLB switched to NBC from CBS.

WEBC and its NBC programming dominated the market in the 1930s and 1940s.  Like most other stations in the "Golden Age of Radio", WEBC carried a general entertainment format as the local affiliate of the NBC Radio Network.  The station ended up on 560 in the mid-1950s after a series of upgrades and frequency changes. In 1955, with radio losing listeners to TV, WEBC dropped NBC and adopted a new format: Top 40.  WEBC featured announcers such as Lance "Tac" Hammer, Lew Latto and "Doctor" Don Rose, among many others.

Bridges was an early adopter of frequency modulation and created a sister station in 1940, WEBC-FM. Ultimately, the station was not a financial success and went off the air in 1950. Although Bridges and Head of the Lakes Broadcasting Company applied to construct a television station in June 1949, this never came to pass.  Instead, WDSM and KDAL overcame their longtime rival by going into television first in 1953. WDSM-TV (now KBJR-TV) became an NBC-TV affiliate, which contributed to WEBC's 1955 switch to Top 40 programming.

WEBC's first ownership change came in 1958 when Bridges sold the station to George Clinton of Clarkesburg, West Virginia for $250,000. At the time of the purchase, Clinton also owned WTMA and WTMA-FM in Charleston.

WEBC began carrying ABC Radio newscasts in 1964.

WEBC was a top-rated station until the mid-1970s, when FM began to attract more listeners.  WEBC briefly switched to country music and then became a forerunner to the classic hits format.  Talk programming was added to the lineup by the late-1980s and took over the entire schedule by 1990. The format was then changed to All-Sports in 2003 after a sale to Clear Channel Communications, which syndicated the "FAN" radio network from KFAN in Minneapolis to a number of its stations in the region. After the station was sold to GapWest Broadcasting in 2007, WEBC joined ESPN Radio, with "FAN" programming soon moving to rival KQDS. GapWest was folded into Townsquare Media on August 13, 2010.

At 6 p.m. on September 30, 2015, WEBC dropped its sports format and began stunting with Christmas music, branded as "Ho Ho 106.5" (now simulcasting on FM translator W293CT 106.5 FM Duluth). At 1 p.m. on October 6, WEBC flipped to classic rock as "Sasquatch 106.5" after a 23-hour marathon of the 1975 song "Bigfoot" by Bro Smith.

On January 30, 2020, Townsquare Media announced that it would acquire WWAX; upon taking over that station under a local marketing agreement on February 1, the classic rock format moved from WEBC to WWAX as "Sasquatch 92.1". After a temporary simulcast, WWAX's former sports talk format moved to WEBC as "Fan 106.5" on February 17, returning the "Fan" network programming (now based at KFXN-FM) to the station.

References

External links

FCC History Cards for WEBC

A Technological History of WEBC Radio

Radio stations in Duluth, Minnesota
Radio stations in Superior, Wisconsin
Townsquare Media radio stations
Sports radio stations in the United States
Radio stations established in 1924